Kholodov or Holodov (from холод meaning cold) is a Russian masculine surname, its feminine counterpart is Kholodova or Holodova. Notable people with the surname include:

Dmitry Kholodov (1967–1994), Russian journalist

Russian-language surnames